Byford Dolphin was a semi-submersible, column-stabilised drilling rig operated by Dolphin Drilling, a Fred Olsen Energy subsidiary. It drilled seasonally for various companies in the United Kingdom, Danish and Norwegian sectors of the North Sea. It was registered in Hamilton, Bermuda.

The rig suffered some serious accidents, most notably an explosive decompression in 1983 that killed four divers and one dive tender, as well as badly injured another dive tender.

As of March 2023, the Byford Dolphin was laid up in Rosfjord, Norway, near Agnefest.

Description 
Built as Deep Sea Driller, it was the first-of-class in the highly successful Aker H-3 series, designed by Aker Group completed at the Aker Verdal shipyard in 1974.

As a drilling rig, Byford Dolphin was equipped with advanced drilling equipment and originally met strict levels of certification under Norwegian law, though in later years, banned from Norwegian waters. Byford Dolphin was able to maneuver with its own engines (to counter drift and ocean currents), but for long-distance relocation, it must be moved by specialist tugboats.

Accidents and incidents

Deep Sea Driller accident 

On 1 March 1976, the rig ran aground during transit from a block in the North Sea to Bergen. All crew were evacuated, but six people died when they fell out of their boats.

Diving bell accident 
On Saturday, 5 November 1983, at 4:00 a.m., while drilling in the Frigg gas field in the Norwegian sector of the North Sea, four divers were in a diving chamber system on the rig's deck that was connected by a trunk (a short passage) to a diving bell. The divers were Edwin Arthur Coward (British, 35 years old), Roy P. Lucas (British, 38), Bjørn Giæver Bergersen (Norwegian, 29) and Truls Hellevik (Norwegian, 34). They were assisted by two dive tenders, William Crammond (British, 32) and Martin Saunders.

Just prior to the event, decompression chambers 1 and 2 (along with a third chamber which was not in use at the time) were connected via a trunk to a diving bell. The connection made by the trunk was kept sealed by a clamp operated by Crammond and Saunders, who were experienced divers. Coward and Lucas were resting in chamber 2 at a pressure of 9 atm. The diving bell with Bergersen and Hellevik had just been winched up after a dive and joined to the trunk. Leaving their wet equipment in the trunk, the two divers climbed through the trunk into chamber 1.

The normal procedure would have been:

 Close the diving bell door, which would have been open to the trunk.
 Slightly increase the pressure in the diving bell to seal the bell door tightly.
 Close the chamber 1 door, which was also open to the trunk.
 Slowly depressurize the trunk until it reached a pressure of 1 atm.
 Open the clamp to separate the diving bell from the chamber system.

The first two steps had been completed when, for an unknown reason, Crammond opened the clamp that was keeping the trunk sealed before Diver 4 (Hellevik) could close the door to the chamber. This resulted in the chamber being explosively decompressed from a pressure of nine atmospheres to the one atmosphere of the unsealed chamber system. Air rushed out of the chamber system with tremendous force, jamming the interior trunk door and pushing the bell away, striking the two tenders. All four divers were killed; one of the tenders, Crammond, was killed, while Saunders was severely injured.

Medical findings 
Medical investigations were carried out on the remains of the four divers. The most notable finding was the presence of large amounts of fat in large arteries and veins and in the cardiac chambers, as well as intravascular fat in organs, especially the liver. This fat was unlikely to be embolic, but must have precipitated from the blood in situ. The autopsy suggested that rapid bubble formation in the blood denatured the lipoprotein complexes, rendering the lipids insoluble. The blood of the three divers left intact inside the chambers likely boiled instantly, stopping their circulation. The fourth diver was dismembered and mutilated by the blast forcing him out through the partially blocked doorway and would have died instantly.

Coward, Lucas, and Bergersen were exposed to the effects of explosive decompression and died in the positions indicated by the diagram. With the escaping air and pressure, it included bisection of his thoracoabdominal cavity, which resulted in fragmentation of his body, followed by expulsion of all of the internal organs of his chest and abdomen, except the trachea and a section of small intestine, and of the thoracic spine. These were projected some distance, one section being found  vertically above the exterior pressure door.

Investigation 
The committee investigating the accident concluded that it was caused by human error on the part of the dive tender who opened the clamp. The trunk door had a center hinge design, similar to a butterfly valve disc, and the door was rotated too far to the left, causing the rim of the interior hatch to lodge on the door opening. This left a crescent shaped opening, similar to a manhole cover left ajar but held in place. This created an opening that was 24 inches across horizontally. It is not clear whether the tender who opened the clamp before the trunk was depressurized did so by order of his supervisor, on his own initiative, or because of miscommunication. At the time, the only communication the tenders on the outside of the chamber system had was through a bullhorn attached to the wall surface; with heavy noise from the rig and sea, it was hard to listen in on what was going on. Fatigue from many hard hours of work also took its toll among the divers, who often worked 16-hour shifts. 

This incident was also attributed to engineering failure. The obsolete Byford Dolphin diving system, dating from 1975, was not equipped with fail-safe hatches, outboard pressure gauges, and an interlocking mechanism, which would have prevented the trunk from being opened while the system was under pressure. Prior to the accident, Norske Veritas had issued the following rule for certification: "Connecting mechanisms between bell and chambers are to be so arranged that they cannot be operated when the trunk is pressurized", therefore requiring such systems to have fail-safe seals and interlocking mechanisms. One month after the accident, Norske Veritas and the Norwegian oil directorate made the rule final for all bell systems.

Among others, former crew members of Byford Dolphin and NOPEF (a Norwegian oil and petro-chemical union) have come forward and claimed the investigation was a cover-up. They claimed that the commission investigating the accident did not mention in their report the irresponsible dispensations on vital equipment requested by Comex and authorized by the diving section to the Norwegian Petroleum Directorate, which played a vital role in the accident's occurrence. They also alleged the accident was due to a lack of proper equipment, including clamping mechanisms equipped with interlocking mechanisms (which would be impossible to open while the chamber system was still under pressure), outboard pressure gauges, and a safe communication system, all of which had been held back because of dispensations by the Norwegian Petroleum Directorate.

Lawsuit 

The North Sea Divers Alliance, formed by early North Sea divers and the relatives of those killed, continued to press for further investigation and, in February 2008, obtained a report that indicated the real cause was faulty equipment. Clare Lucas, daughter of Roy Lucas, said: "I would go so far as to say that the Norwegian Government murdered my father because they knew that they were diving with an unsafe decompression chamber." The families of the divers eventually received compensation for the damages from the Norwegian government 26 years after the incident.

Other incidents 
On 17 April 2002, a 44-year-old Norwegian worker on the rig was struck on the head and killed in an industrial accident. The accident resulted in Byford Dolphin losing an exploration contract with Statoil, which expressed concerns with the rig's operating procedures. The incident cost the company millions of dollars in lost income.

See also 

, a fictional film set in the 1970s Norwegian oil industry, and which features a fatal decompression chamber accident and its cover-up

References

Further reading 

  – A documentation of offshore diving and pioneer divers on the Norwegian continental shelf; contains a section on safety and responsibility
  – News report on Byford Dolphin and other incidents in the North Sea

Commercial diving accidents
Decompression accidents and incidents
Drilling rigs
Engineering failures
History of the petroleum industry in the United Kingdom
Maritime incidents in 1976
Maritime incidents in 1983
Maritime incidents in 2001
Maritime incidents in 2002
1974 ships
Oil platforms
Semi-submersibles
Ships of BP